KLAA may refer to:

 The ICAO airport code for Lamar Municipal Airport (Colorado) in Lamar, Colorado
 KLAA (AM), a radio station (830 AM) licensed to the city of Orange, California
 KLAA-FM, a radio station (103.5 FM) licensed to Tioga, Louisiana
 A callsign formerly used by KARD (TV), licensed to Monroe, Louisiana, from October 1974 until December 1982